Jacob Edward Schlereth (December 1, 1980 – November 27, 2012) was a United States Army soldier. He was in the infantry, cavalry, and was a drill sergeant.

Known his whole life as "Jake", Schlereth completed three tours of duty, one in Iraq and two in Afghanistan, and was serving as a reconnaissance instructor when he died suddenly at age 31 from an unexplained coronary anomaly.

Career 
Schlereth enlisted in the U.S. Army on April 22, 1999, reenlisting twice in 2004 and 2009.  He found great pride in being a member of the Infantry and excelled in combat and leadership.

At the time of his death, the U.S. Army summarized his career as follows:

Awards and decorations

Bronze Star medals 
During his military career, Schlereth received the Bronze Star Medal four times, twice with the Valor distinction to denote "participation in acts of heroism involving conflict with an armed enemy".  His first award with valor included a narrative that exemplifies Schlereth's career in the U.S. Army:

Additionally, on the recommendation for this award, Schlereth's Squadron Commander wrote:  "Highly recommended.  SFC Schlereth's actions of heroism are in keeping with the highest traditions of military service, & go well beyond the call of duty."  On the same recommendation, the Commanding General James D. Thurman wrote: "Well deserved by a heroic soldier!"

Legacy

Appearance on 60 Minutes 
For the segment, "Afghanistan: Fighting In A 'Hornet's Nest'", Logan spent nearly a month at a remote U.S. Army base interviewing some of that staff and following them on patrols across the rugged Afghan terrain, even experiencing gunfire and mortars from enemy attacks.

The entire video, renamed "Combat in Afghanistan", was published on YouTube by CBS News in 2010.

Likeness in military museum 

In 2011, Schlereth was selected to take part in the "Faces of Valor" Project of the Fort Campbell Historical Society.  Army soldiers who had been awarded the Bronze Star with Valor were chosen to have their likeness recreated in one of the many exhibits to be featured in the upcoming Wings of Liberty Museum. Casts were made of his hands and head and incorporated into a wax figure on display as one of seven tableau depicting the rich history of the 101st Airborne Division.

Memorial scholarship
Created by his family in 2014, the SFC Jacob E. Schlereth Memorial Endowed Scholarship at Auburn University is awarded annually to students enrolled in the Samuel Ginn College of Engineering and who are veterans of the U.S. military.  Students must hold a minimum grade point average of 3.0 on a 4.0 scale.

Personal life 

During his military career, Schlereth began dating Margaret Bentley, also of Vassar, Michigan. The two corresponded during his first deployment and Margaret moved to Clarksville, Tennessee to pursue their relationship while he was stationed at Fort Campbell, continuing during his second deployment.  On April 14, 2007, they married and in May 2010 had a son.  In 2011, Schlereth was transferred to Fort Benning in Columbus, Georgia and the young family relocated to the city of Auburn, Alabama where Margaret was hired as a Development Officer for Auburn University’s College of Engineering.

On Tuesday, November 27, 2012, Schlereth died unexpectedly from a sudden heart malfunction just before instructing a lesson on base at Fort Benning.  Doctors were unable to accurately attribute the cause of death although he had no prior diagnosed problems, nor known hereditary conditions.

References

Further reading
 regional news M-Live article noting Schlereth's death, December 2012
  local affiliate WTVM-ABC9 article noting Schlereth's death, December 2012

External links 
 60 MINUTES profile, October 2008
 Full video from 60 MINUTES profile, October 2008
 Auburn University Memorial Scholarship information

1980 births
2012 deaths